James Rogers (October 24, 1795 – December 21, 1873) was a United States representative from South Carolina. He was  born in what is now Goshen Hill Township, Union County, South Carolina. He completed preparatory studies and was graduated from South Carolina College at Columbia, South Carolina, in 1813. Later, he studied law and was admitted to the bar and began practice in Yorkville (now York), South Carolina.

Rogers held various local offices before he was elected as a Jacksonian to the Twenty-fourth Congress (March 4, 1835 – March 3, 1837). He was an unsuccessful candidate for reelection in 1836 to the Twenty-fifth Congress. Years later, he was elected as a Democrat to the Twenty-sixth and Twenty-seventh Congresses (March 4, 1839 – March 3, 1843). He died in South Carolina, on December 21, 1873, and was buried in what was formerly called the Irish Graveyard at Kings Creek A.R.P. Church near Newberry, South Carolina.

References

1795 births
1873 deaths
Jacksonian members of the United States House of Representatives from South Carolina
19th-century American politicians
Democratic Party members of the United States House of Representatives from South Carolina
People from Union County, South Carolina
People from York, South Carolina